Kallol Mukherjee (Born ) is a wildlife phototgrapher based in Singur, West Bengal, India. He has won several wildlife photography awards on a national and international level.

Life and career 
Kallol's career began in 2010 when he started to shoot birds in his backyard.

Publications 
His works have been published in various print media and magazines like BBC, Forbes, The Guardian, and newspapers on a regular basis. One of his discoveries is of an endanged Altai Falcon (altaicus), found and photographed in Buxa Tiger Reserve, West Bengal, India.

Awards

References

External links 

 Official Instagram

Indian photographers
Indian wildlife photographers
Living people
People from Singur
Year of birth missing (living people)
Photographers from West Bengal
21st-century Indian photographers
Bengali Hindus
21st-century Bengalis